The Tour du Sud-Est was a professional cycle race held as a stage race in France. It was first held in 1919 and held for the final time in 1983, although it wasn't held every year. In 1965 it was part of the Super Prestige Pernod series. The race was also known by different names in its history: Circuit de Provence (1919–1920), Circuit du Byrrh (1927–1929), Tour des Provinces du Sud-Est (1955–1957) and Circuit du Provençal (1964–1965).

Winners

References

Men's road bicycle races
Cycle races in France
Super Prestige Pernod races
Recurring sporting events established in 1919
Recurring sporting events disestablished in 1983
Defunct cycling races in France
1919 establishments in France
1983 disestablishments in France